I-201 may refer to:

 I-201 class submarine, a class of submarines of the Imperial Japanese Navy during World War II
 Japanese submarine I-201, a World War II diesel-powered submarine